"Call Me" is a song by Canadian rapper Nav and American record producer Metro Boomin. It is one of the dual singles from their collaborative mixtape Perfect Timing. The song was released for digital download on July 14, 2017 with the lead single, the title track of the mixtape.

Music video
The music video for "Call Me" was released on August 18, 2017 on Nav's Vevo account and was directed by RJ Sanchez. The video was shot in Magic City Club in Atlanta. Nav (rapper) and Metro Boomin are seen showing off Ferrari Portofino in the music video. As of May 2021, the video has surpassed over 60 million views.

Track listing

Charts

Weekly charts

Certifications

Release history

Notes

References

2017 songs
2017 singles
Metro Boomin songs
Nav (rapper) songs
Republic Records singles
XO (record label) singles
Songs written by Metro Boomin
Song recordings produced by Metro Boomin
Songs written by Nav (rapper)
Songs written by Amir Esmailian